Omorgus tatei is a species of hide beetle in the subfamily Omorginae.

References

tatei
Beetles described in 1892